Alessio Sanavia (born 19 September 1996) is an Italian rugby union player, currently playing for Italian United Rugby Championship side Zebre Parma. His preferred position is prop.

References

External links
itsrugby.co.uk Profile

Living people
Italian rugby union players
Valorugby Emilia players
Zebre Parma players
Rugby union props
2001 births
People from Dolo